Gilda Texter (born November 26, 1946) is an American costume designer, wardrobe supervisor and actress.

Career
Gilda Texter is a costume designer who worked in the costume and wardrobe departments of over 40 movies and television productions.

Her feature film debut was in the 1971 cult movie Vanishing Point, where she appeared nude riding a motorcycle, and was credited as "Nude Rider" (her character was never named).

Texter appeared in two other movies, also released in 1971: Angels Hard as They Come and Runaway, Runaway.

Filmography

Costume Supervisor
 Romancing the Stone (1984)
 Air America (1990)
 Revenge (1990)
 Snake Eyes (1998)
 The Green Mile (1999)
 Love Don't Cost a Thing (2003)
 Garfield: The Movie (2004)
 Lonely Hearts (2006)

Costumer
 The Majestic (2001)
 Herbie: Fully Loaded (2005)

Actress
 The Gun Runner (1969) - Gilda
 House of Zodiac (1969)
 Vanishing Point (1971) - Nude Rider
 Angels Hard as They Come (1971) - Astrid
 Runaway, Runaway (1971) - Rikki (final film role)

References

External links
 

Living people
American film actresses
1946 births
American costume designers
Nudity
21st-century American women